VanValkenburg is a surname. Notable people with this surname include:
 Schuyler VanValkenburg (born 1982), American teacher and politician
 Zach VanValkenburg (born 1998), American football player

See also
Valkenburg (surname)